Marumagal may refer to:
 Marumagal (1953 film), a 1953 Indian Tamil film
 Marumagal (1986 film), a 1986 Indian Tamil film